Dmytro Sorokin (born 14 July 1988), is a Ukrainian futsal player who played for Prodexim Kherson and the Ukraine national futsal team.

References

External links
UEFA profile

1988 births
Living people
Ukrainian men's futsal players
MFC Lokomotyv Kharkiv players
MFC Prodexim Kherson players